The mottled eel (Anguilla bengalensis), also known as the African mottled eel, the Indian longfin eel, the Indian mottled eel, the long-finned eel or the river eel, is a demersal, catadromous eel in the family Anguillidae. It was described by John McClelland in 1844. It is a tropical, freshwater eel which is known from East Africa, Bangladesh, Andaman Islands, Mozambique, Malawi, Sri Lanka, Sumatra, and Indonesia and recently from Madagascar. The eels spend most of their lives in freshwater at a depth range of 3–10 metres, but migrate to the Indian Ocean to breed. Males can reach a maximum total length of 121 centimetres and a maximum weight of 7,000 grams. The eels feed primarily off of benthic crustaceans, mollusks, finfish and worms.

The exact classification of the species was a debate in recent times, where some major fish websites (ex. Fish Base) classified the species under the name A. nebulosa. But according to the IUCN Red List 2015 version, the fish species should be classified as A. bengalensis with some subspecies.

Subspecies
 Anguilla bengalensis bengalensis sometimes known as the Indian mottled eel.
 Anguilla bengalensis labiata sometimes known as the African mottled eel.

References

Anguillidae
Near threatened animals
Fish described in 1831
Taxa named by John Edward Gray